Ivan Lendl was the defending champion, but lost in third round to Joakim Nyström.

Mats Wilander won the title by defeating Martín Jaite 6–3, 6–4, 6–4 in the final.

Seeds

Draw

Finals

Top half

Section 1

Section 2

Bottom half

Section 3

Section 4

References

External links
 Official results archive (ATP)
 Official results archive (ITF)

1987 Italian Open (tennis)
Italian Open
Italian Open (Tennis), 1987
Italian Open